Tom Virture (born November 19, 1957) is an American actor. He is known for his roles in the television series Even Stevens (2000–2003) and The Secret Life of the American Teenager (2008–2013).

Filmography

Film

Television

Video games

References

External links

1957 births
Living people
20th-century American male actors
21st-century American male actors
Male actors from Texas
American male film actors
American male television actors
Northwestern University alumni
People from Sherman, Texas